A gamete (ultimately ) is a haploid cell that fuses with another haploid cell during fertilization in organisms that reproduce sexually. Gametes are an organism's reproductive cells, also referred to as sex cells. In species that produce two morphologically distinct types of gametes, and in which each individual produces only one type, a female is any individual that produces the larger type of gamete—called an ovum— and a male produces the smaller type—called a sperm.  Sperm cells or spermatozoa are small and motile due to the flagellum, a tail-shaped structure that allows the cell to propel and move. In contrast, each egg cell or ovum is relatively large and non-motile. In short a gamete is an egg cell (female gamete) or a sperm (male gamete). In animals, ova mature in the ovaries of females and sperm develop in the testes of males. During fertilization, a spermatozoon and ovum unite to form a new diploid organism. Gametes carry half the genetic information of an individual, one ploidy of each type, and are created through meiosis, in which a germ cell undergoes two fissions, resulting in the production of four gametes. In biology, the type of gamete an organism produces determines the classification of its sex.

This is an example of anisogamy or heterogamy, the condition in which females and males produce gametes of different sizes (this is the case in humans; the human ovum has approximately 100,000 times the volume of a single human sperm cell). In contrast, isogamy is the state of gametes from both sexes being the same size and shape, and given arbitrary designators for mating type. The name gamete was introduced by the German cytologist Eduard Strasburger. Male and female gametes set the basis for the sexual roles and sexual selection.

Oogenesis is the process of female gamete formation in animals. This process involves meiosis (including meiotic recombination) occurring in the diploid primary oocyte to produce the haploid ovum. Spermatogenesis is the process of male gamete formation in animals. This process also involves meiosis occurring in the diploid primary spermatocyte to produce the haploid spermatozoon.

Evolution 

It is generally accepted that isogamy is the ancestral state from which anisogamy evolved, although its evolution has left no fossil records.  Oogamy also evolved from isogamy through anisogamy. There are almost invariably only two gamete types, all analyses showing that intermediate gamete sizes are eliminated due to selection. Intermediate sized gametes do not have the same advantages as small or large ones; they do worse than small ones in mobility and numbers, and worse than large ones in supply.

Dissimilarity
In contrast to a gamete, a diploid somatic cell of an individual contains one copy of the chromosome set from the sperm and one copy of the chromosome set from the egg cell. Consequently, the cells of the offspring have genes potentially capable of expressing characteristics of both the father and the mother, subject to whether they are dominant or recessive. A gamete's chromosomes are not exact duplicates of either of the sets of chromosomes carried in the diploid chromosomes but a mixture of the two.

Sex determination in mammals and birds
Humans and most mammals use the XY sex-determination system in which a normal ovum can carry only an X chromosome whereas a sperm may carry either an X or a Y, while a non-normal sperm cell can end up carrying either no sex-defining chromosomes, an XY pair, or an XX pair; thus the male sperm determines the sex of any resulting zygote. If the zygote has two X chromosomes it will develop into a female, if it has an X and a Y chromosome, it will develop into a male.

For birds, the female ovum determines the sex of the offspring, through the ZW sex-determination system.

Artificial gametes
Artificial gametes, also known as In vitro derived gametes (IVD), stem cell-derived gametes (SCDGs), and In vitro generated gametes (IVG), are gametes derived from stem cells. The use of such artificial gametes would [QUOTE:] "necessarily require IVF techniques". Research shows that artificial gametes may be a reproductive technique for same-sex male couples, although a surrogate mother would still be required for the gestation period.  Women who have passed menopause may be able to produce eggs and bear genetically related children with artificial gametes. Robert Sparrow wrote, in the Journal of Medical Ethics, that embryos derived from artificial gametes could be used to derive new gametes and this process could be repeated to create multiple human generations in the laboratory. This technique could be used to create cell lines for medical applications and for studying the heredity of genetic disorders.  Additionally, this technique could be used for human enhancement by selectively breeding for a desired genome or by using recombinant DNA technology to create enhancements that have not arisen in nature.

Plants

Plants which reproduce sexually also produce gametes. However, since plants have a life cycle involving alternation of diploid and haploid generations some differences exist.  Plants use meiosis to produce spores that develop into multicellular haploid gametophytes which produce gametes by mitosis. The sperm are formed in an organ known as the antheridium and the egg cells in a flask-shaped organ called the archegonium. In flowering plants, the female gametophyte is produced inside the ovule within the ovary of the flower.  When mature, the haploid gametophyte produces female gametes which are ready for fertilization. The male gametophyte is produced inside a pollen grain within the anther. When a pollen grain lands on a mature stigma of a flower it germinates to form a pollen tube that grows down the style into the ovary of the flower and then into the ovule. The pollen then produces sperm by mitosis and releases them for fertilization.

See also
 Coenogamete

Notes and references

Classical genetics
Germ cells
Reproductive system